Roger Connor (July 1, 1857 – January 4, 1931) was a 19th-century Major League Baseball (MLB) player. He played for several teams, but his longest tenure was in New York, where he was responsible for the New York Gothams becoming known as the Giants. He was the player whom Babe Ruth succeeded as the all-time career home run champion. Connor hit 138 home runs during his 18-year career, and his career home run record stood for 23 years after his retirement in 1897.

Connor owned and managed minor league baseball teams after his playing days. He was elected to the Baseball Hall of Fame by its Veterans Committee in 1976. Largely forgotten after his retirement, Connor was buried in an unmarked grave until a group of citizens raised money for a grave marker in 2001.

Early life
Connor was born in Waterbury, Connecticut. He was the son of Irish immigrants Mortimer Connor and Catherine Sullivan Connor. His father had arrived in the United States only five years before Roger's birth. The family lived in the Irish section of Waterbury, known as the Abrigador district, which was separated from the rest of the city by a large granite hill. Connor was the third of eleven children born to the family, though two did not survive childhood. Connor left school around age 12 to work with his father at the local brass works.

Connor entered professional baseball with the Waterbury Monitors of the Eastern League in 1876. Though he was left-handed, Connor was initially a third baseman; in early baseball, left-handed third basemen were more common than they are in modern baseball. In 1878 he would transfer to the minor league Holyoke Shamrocks, where he became known for hitting home runs across the field into the Connecticut River. This so-impressed Springfield baseball boss Bob Ferguson that he signed Connor onto the National League (NL) Troy Trojans when he bought them out in 1880.

MLB playing career

Early years (1880–1889)
In Connor's first year with the Troy Trojans, he teamed with future Hall of Fame players Dan Brouthers, Buck Ewing, Tim Keefe and Mickey Welch, all of whom were just starting their careers. Also on that 1880 Trojans team, though much older, was player-manager Bob "Death to Flying Things" Ferguson. Though Connor, Ferguson and Welch were regularly in the lineup, the other future stars each played in only a handful of the team's 83 games that season. The team finished in fourth place with a 41–42 win–loss record. Connor committed 60 errors in 83 games and sustained a shoulder injury, prompting a position change to first baseman for 1881.

He later played for the New York Gothams, and, due to his great stature, gave that team the enduring nickname "Giants". Connor hit baseball's first grand slam on September 10, 1881, at Riverfront Park in Rensselaer, New York. His grand slam came with two outs and his team down three runs in the bottom of the ninth inning, a situation known today as a walk-off home run. George Vecsey, in The New York Times wrote: "Roger Connor was a complete player — a deft first baseman and an agile base runner who hit 233 triples and stole 244 bases despite his size (6 feet 3 inches and 200 pounds)."

He led the NL with a .371 average in 1885. On September 11, 1886, Connor hit a ball completely out of the Polo Grounds, a very difficult park in which to hit home runs. He hit the pitch from Boston's Old Hoss Radbourn over the right field fence and onto 112th Street. The New York Times reported of the feat, "He met it squarely and it soared up with the speed of a carrier pigeon. All eyes were turned on the tiny sphere as it soared over the head of Charlie Buffinton in right field." A group of fans with the New York Stock Exchange took up a collection for Connor and bought him a $500 gold watch in honor of the home run.

Players' League (1890)
Another New York baseball team, also known as the Giants, emerged with the founding of the Players' League (PL) in 1890. Several players from the NL team left for the new league's Giants team, including future Hall of Famers Connor, Keefe, Jim O'Rourke and Hank O'Day. In 123 games, Connor registered 169 hits, a .349 batting average, 14 home runs, 103 runs batted in (RBI) and 22 stolen bases. His home run total led the league and it represented the only major league single-season home run title that he won. Connor experimented with some changes to his batting style that year. He hit more balls to the opposite field and he sometimes batted right-handed, though he did not have much success from the right side.

Though Connor had success in his season with the PL, the league struggled. Some of the teams ran into financial difficulties.  National League teams rescheduled many of their games to conflict with PL games in the same cities, and a high number of PL games were cancelled late in the season due to rainouts. Connor was optimistic that the league would be successful in 1891, but it officially broke up that January.

Later career (1891–1897)
Returning to the NL Giants for a season in 1891, Connor hit .294. In the offseason before 1892, Connor signed with the Philadelphia Athletics. The team broke up shortly after Connor signed, and his contract was awarded to the Philadelphia Phillies for that year. He returned to the Giants in 1893, raising his average to .322 and hitting 11 home runs. During the 1894 season, the Giants looked toward the team's youth and Connor lost his starting position to Jack Doyle. He was released that year and picked up by the St. Louis Browns. The next year, his brother Joe Connor made his major league debut with the same team. Joe played two games with St. Louis before being sent back down to the minor leagues. That year's St. Louis team finished with a 39–92 record,  games out of first place.

Connor was released by the Browns in May 1897 after starting the season with a .227 batting average. His major league playing career was over. While a major league player, Connor was regularly among the league leaders in batting average and home runs. Connor's career mark of 138 was a benchmark not surpassed until 1921 by Babe Ruth. He finished his career with a .317 batting average. Connor finished in the top ten in batting average ten times, all between 1880 and 1891.  Over an 18-year career, Connor finished in the top ten for doubles ten times, finished in the top three for triples seven times and remains fifth all-time in triples with 233. He also established his power credentials by finishing in the top ten in RBI ten times and top ten in homers twelve times.

Personal
In 1886, Connor and his wife Angeline had a daughter named Lulu. She died as an infant. Connor interpreted the baby's death as God's punishment for marrying Angeline, who was not Catholic. Angeline had secretly begun receiving Catholic education and was planning to surprise Connor by getting baptized on the day that Lulu would have turned a year old. The couple later adopted a girl named Cecelia from a Catholic orphanage in New York City.

Roger and Angeline Connor lived in Waterbury, Connecticut, for many years, even while Roger played in New York. Every winter, a banquet was held in Waterbury in Connor's honor. Near the end of the 19th century, Angeline gave Roger a weather vane which had been constructed from two of his baseball bats. The weather vane served as a well-known landmark in Waterbury even after the couple moved away.

Later life

Minor league baseball
Connor signed with the Fall River Indians of the New England League in June 1897. Connor attracted some attention by wearing eyeglasses on the field. He hit cleanup, played first base and was popular among fans. In 1898, Connor moved back to his hometown of Waterbury and purchased the local minor league team. He served as president, manager and played first base on the side. Connor's wife, Angeline, kept the team's books and his daughter helped by collecting tickets. Joe Connor was the team's catcher; he later returned to the major leagues for several seasons. After the 1899 season, Connor expressed satisfaction with his Waterbury team, saying that the team played well and did not lose money despite not getting strong attendance numbers at their games.

In 1901, Connor became interested in purchasing the minor league franchise in Hartford, Connecticut. The team had been dropped from the Eastern League and had suffered financial losses related to traveling as far away as Canada for games. Connor proposed that he might purchase the team and attempt to have it admitted to the Connecticut State League, decreasing its travel requirements. However, upon selling the Waterbury club at the end of that season, he bought the Springfield Ponies franchise in the same league.

Retirement from baseball

In September 1903, Connor announced his retirement from baseball and placed his team up for sale. He had made a similar statement the year before and apparently on a frequent basis before that. In June 1902, the local newspaper said, "Roger bobs up every summer and makes his farewell to the baseball public." His 1903 retirement was earnest though; he attended a 1904 Springfield-Norwich game as a retired spectator.

Connor worked as a school inspector in Waterbury until 1920. He lived to see his career home run record bested by Babe Ruth, although if it was celebrated, it might have been on the wrong day. At one time, Connor's record was thought to be 131, per the Sporting News book Daguerreotypes. As late as the 1980s, in the MacMillan Baseball Encyclopedia, it was thought to be 136. However, John Tattersall's 1975 Home Run Handbook, a publication of the Society for American Baseball Research (SABR), credited Connor with 138. Both MLB.com and the independent Baseball-Reference.com now consider Connor's total to be 138.

Death
Connor died on January 4, 1931, following a lengthy stomach illness. He was 73. A news article after his death said that his "likeable personality and his colorful action made him an idol." He was buried in an unmarked grave at St. Joseph's Cemetery in Waterbury. Connor was inducted to the Baseball Hall of Fame in 1976. Hall of Fame umpire Bill Klem had long campaigned on behalf of Connor's inclusion in the Hall of Fame. Decades after his death, Waterbury citizens and baseball fans raised enough money to purchase a headstone at his grave, which was dedicated in a 2001 ceremony.

See also

 List of Major League Baseball career hits leaders
 List of Major League Baseball career doubles leaders
 List of Major League Baseball career triples leaders
 List of Major League Baseball career runs scored leaders
 List of Major League Baseball career runs batted in leaders
 List of Major League Baseball career stolen bases leaders
 List of Major League Baseball batting champions
 List of Major League Baseball annual doubles leaders
 List of Major League Baseball annual triples leaders
 List of Major League Baseball annual runs batted in leaders
 List of Major League Baseball players to hit for the cycle
 List of Major League Baseball single-game hits leaders
 List of Major League Baseball triples records
 List of Major League Baseball player-managers
 List of St. Louis Cardinals team records

Notes

References
Kerr, Roy. Roger Connor: Home Run King of 19th Century Baseball. McFarland, 2011. .

External links

, or Retrosheet

1857 births
1931 deaths
19th-century baseball players
American people of Irish descent
Baseball players from Connecticut
Burials in Connecticut
Catholics from Connecticut
Connecticut League managers
Fall River Indians players
Hartford (minor league baseball) players
Holyoke (minor league baseball) players
Major League Baseball first basemen
Major League Baseball player-managers
Minor league baseball managers
National Baseball Hall of Fame inductees
National League batting champions
National League RBI champions
New Bedford (minor league baseball) players
New Haven Blues players
New Haven (minor league baseball) players
New York Giants (NL) players
New York Giants (PL) players
Philadelphia Phillies players
Sportspeople from Waterbury, Connecticut
Springfield Ponies players
St. Louis Browns (NL) players
Troy Trojans players
Waterbury Indians players
Waterbury Pirates players
Waterbury Rough Riders players